Joseph Babcock may refer to:

Joseph Park Babcock (1893–1949), American writer who popularized Mahjong in the U.S.
Joseph W. Babcock (1850–1909), U.S. Representative from Wisconsin